Milan Zarije Ljubenović (Serbian Cyrillic: Милан Зарије Љубеновић; 30 January 1932 – 28 August 1989) was a Serbian footballer.

Biography
Born in Novi Sad, Kingdom of Yugoslavia, he played with FK Radnički Beograd between 1949 and 1961. After playing in the Yugoslav Second League during the initial seasons, they earned promotion in 1953, having played with the club in the Yugoslav First League until his retirement in 1961. For Radnički he played over 500 matches, of which 170 were in the First League. Known for being a discrete working player on the field, he begin playing as right-winger becoming with time the pillar of the defence.

In 1954 he made his debut for the Yugoslav national team having played a total of 4 matches until 1955.

He was graduated in stomatology.

References

External links
 

1930 births
1989 deaths
Footballers from Novi Sad
Serbian footballers
Yugoslav footballers
Yugoslavia international footballers
Association football defenders
FK Radnički Beograd players
Yugoslav First League players